Chuck Nice (born July 10, 1975) is an American stand-up comedian and radio personality from Philadelphia, Pennsylvania, where he started his career hosting a show atop a new-wave dance club The Bank.

Nice was a comedic show host on QVC's sister show Q2. Nice was also heard on The Radio Chick, a comedic show formerly on 92.3 Free FM in New York City. Nice is a frequent contributor to VH1’s Best Week Ever and truTV's The Smoking Gun Presents: World's Dumbest..., and he performs regularly at the HA! Comedy Club and Comic Strip Live in NYC. He has been featured in commercials for Smirnoff and Enterprise Rent-A-Car.
He often co-hosts the TV show and podcast StarTalk alongside astrophysicist Neil deGrasse Tyson, and he has also been the most frequent co-host on the TV adaptation. Starting on February 1, 2017, Nice has also been the permanent co-host of the StarTalk spinoff Playing with Science alongside Gary O'Reilly.

He appeared on The Tyra Banks Show with Best Week Evers Michelle Collins.

He hosted a TEDTalk titled "A Funny Look at the Unintended Consequences of Technology" in 2017.

He is also currently the host of the top-10 countdown that airs weekly on the Centric Network. He also hosts HGTV's Buy Like a Mega-Millionaire.

Chuck Nice hosted the ninth season of Brain Games, branded Brain Games: On the Road.

References

External links

Chuck Nice's Official website

1975 births
20th-century African-American people
21st-century African-American people
21st-century American comedians
African-American male comedians
American male comedians
African-American radio personalities
American radio personalities
American stand-up comedians
Living people
Radio personalities from Philadelphia